All Wrong may refer to:

All Wrong (film), a 1919 American silent comedy film
"All Wrong" (song), a song by God Lives Underwater 
"All Wrong", a song by The Story So Far from What You Don't See